Andrew Michael MacLeod is an Australian/British businessman, author, humanitarian lawyer, philanthropist  and former aid worker.

MacLeod is CEO and Chair of British-based Griffin Law, a Non-Executive Director of the New York-based Cornerstone Capital, Saudi based Arabian Leopard Fund, UAE based Burnham Global, a visiting professor at King's College London, a Vice Chancellor's Distinguished Fellow at Deakin University and a Council member at Keele University. He was formerly a humanitarian official with both the International Committee for the Red Cross and the United Nations. He is co-founder of Swiss/US charity Hear Their Cries. He maintains a Commission as an Australian Army reserve officer.

He served as Chief of Operations of the United Nations Emergency Coordination Centre in the international response to the 2005 Kashmir earthquake in Pakistan. Previously he was CEO of the Committee for Melbourne, an Affiliate Senior Associate to the Center for Strategic International Studies in Washington DC; sat on the Sustainable Accounting Advisory Board; advised numerous charities, was General Manager Communities, Communications and External Relations at global miner Rio Tinto, a board member and formerly chairman of Principles for Social Investment.

Early life and education

MacLeod was born in Melbourne, Australia. He was educated at St Michael's Grammar School in Melbourne, where he was Captain of the School, and obtained his combined Bachelor of Arts and Bachelor of Laws degree from the University of Tasmania in 1993 where he also swam for the Sandy Bay swimming club. MacLeod also holds a Master of Laws (International Law) from the University of Southampton and a Graduate Diploma in International Law from the University of Melbourne. In 2021 MacLeod finished a course of theological studies and was awarded an Associateship of King's College, the AKC.

Career

Humanitarian
MacLeod worked with the International Committee of the Red Cross (ICRC) in Yugoslavia during the Yugoslav wars and in Rwanda. It was for his first deployment to the Balkans that MacLeod was awarded the Humanitarian Overseas Service Medal, with a second award of the Humanitarian Overseas Service Medal for Rwanda (Great Lakes).

From 2003 to 2005 MacLeod was head of Early Warning and Emergency Preparedness for UNHCR. In 2005, MacLeod worked as Chief of Operations of the United Nations Emergency Coordination Center which provided information and coordination to the NGOs and United Nations agencies delivering aid and relief after the Pakistan earthquake. MacLeod then became the first 'Relief to Recovery Transition' specialist, ensuring no drop-off in service delivery to the people in the transitional period. He remained in Pakistan until 2008. MacLeod left the United Nations in 2009 after a year-long deployment to The Philippines.

MacLeod became critical of the lack of effectiveness and efficiency of the United Nations as he saw it. He raised a number of criticisms of the humanitarian system in his book "A Life Half Lived"Here including the UN's failure to crack down on UN staff paedophilia and hebophilia. He has also been published in several newspapers on the subject here.

Philanthropist 
MacLeod is a co-founder and co-funder of HearTheirCries.org a Swiss association fighting sexual abuse in the Aid industry. HTC is also a 501(c)(3) Charity in the United States.

Business
Between 2010 and 2012, MacLeod served as CEO of the Committee For Melbourne, an independent network of Melbourne leaders working for Melbourne's liveability and economic prosperity. He also served as General Manager Community, Communications and External Relations for global giant Rio Tinto. From 2013 to 2019 Macleod was a member of the management board of New York-based Cornerstone Capital. Now he is Chairman of Griffin Law, a Non-Executive Director at Burnham Global, a member of the Audit and Risk Committee at Risk Advisory Group, and a senior advisor to UK based Critical Resource. He is a graduate member of the Australian Institute of Company Directors.

Academic
He currently serves as a visiting professor at King's College London and was an Adjunct Senior Lecturer at the University of Tasmania Law School. He is a Vice Chancellor's Distinguished Fellow at Deakin University.

China and One Belt One Road

Professor MacLeod is a public policy expert focusing on a number of issues including China's Belt and Road Initiative as well as issues of international commerce, trade, finance and counter-terrorism.

Published works

MacLeod is the author of "A Life Half Lived" published by New Holland Press in 2013.Here.

Sport

MacLeod won the silver medal for the 200m Butterfly at the World Masters Games in 2002.

Awards and decorations

MacLeod is also a recipient of the Australian Defence Medal for his service as an Army Reserve Officer. He was awarded the Humanitarian Overseas Service Medal twice. He was awarded the Deakin University Distinguished Fellows award, the University of Tasmania Foundation Distinguished Alumni award and the Young Britons Foundation Global Award for Freedom.

References

People educated at St Michael's Grammar School
University of Tasmania alumni
Alumni of the University of Southampton
Melbourne Law School alumni
Living people
Australian public servants
Australian officials of the United Nations
British officials of the United Nations
Year of birth missing (living people)
Businesspeople from Melbourne